The Mill Creek Bridge is located north of Cherokee, Iowa, United States. On June 24, 1891, a disastrous flood along the Little Sioux River and its tributaries wiped out nearly every bridge in Cherokee County. The following month the county board of supervisors signed a contract with the George E. King Bridge Co. of Des Moines for 17,650 to replace the bridges. This Pratt truss bridge was fabricated by the King Bridge Company of Cleveland, Ohio. It and a similar span over Mill Creek near Larrabee are the only two that remain. This bridge was listed on the National Register of Historic Places in 1998. A modern concrete span, built just upstream in 2006, now carries the road. The old bridge is closed to vehicular traffic.

References

Bridges completed in 1891
Buildings and structures in Cherokee County, Iowa
Truss bridges in Iowa
Road bridges on the National Register of Historic Places in Iowa
National Register of Historic Places in Cherokee County, Iowa
Pratt truss bridges in the United States
Metal bridges in the United States